Masal Rural District is a rural district (dehestan) in the Central District of Masal County, Gilan Province, Iran. At the 2006 census, its population was 5,419, in 1,368 families. The rural district has 26 villages.

References 

Rural Districts of Gilan Province
Masal County
Populated places in Masal County